Stenløse is a  town in Egedal Municipality in Region Hovedstaden on the island of Zealand (Sjælland) in eastern Denmark. Since January 1, 2010, it has merged with Ølstykke and forms the urban area of Ølstykke-Stenløse with 22,030 inhabitants.

See also 
 Stenløse station
 Stenløse BK

References

External links 
 Egedal municipality's official website (Danish only)
 Municipal statistics: NetBorger Kommunefakta, delivered from KMD aka Kommunedata (Municipal Data)
 Municipal mergers and neighbors: Eniro new municipalities map

Cities and towns in the Capital Region of Denmark
Egedal Municipality